Sarah Anne Pascale Hulton  is a British diplomat who is the High Commissioner of the United Kingdom to Sri Lanka and the Maldives. She officially became the British High Commissioner of Sri Lanka in August 2019 who replaced James Dauris who previously served in the office since 2015. She is also the recipient of Officer of the Order of the British Empire, an award which is awarded for prominent national or regional achievements in the UK.

Career 

Hulton served as Head of Democratic People's Republic of Korea Department from 2017 to 2018. She is also currently employed as Deputy Director at the Human Resources Directorate at Foreign and Commonwealth Office from 2018. In April 2019, she was formally appointed as the new British High Commissioner to Sri Lanka and the Maldives.

References 

Living people
British women ambassadors
High Commissioners of the United Kingdom to the Maldives
High Commissioners of the United Kingdom to Sri Lanka
Officers of the Order of the British Empire
Year of birth missing (living people)